Trance Remixes is a 2002 album by 2 Unlimited, a Eurodance project founded in 1991 by Belgian producers Jean-Paul DeCoster and Phil Wilde and fronted by Dutch rapper Ray Slijngaard and Dutch vocalist Anita Doth.

Album information
Trance Remixes contains 16 remixes of 2 Unlimited's greatest hits from studio albums Get Ready!, No Limits and Real Things.

Release history
Trance Remixes was released in December 2002 in Japan.

Track listing
 No Limit (Moon Project Remix Edit) (3:49) 
 Twilight Zone (PK Hard Trance Radio Edit) (3:18) 
 Tribal Dance (Tribal Trance Mix) (8:03) 
 Maximum Overdrive (KG Hitman Remix) (8:07) 
 Get Ready for This (Yves De Ruyter Edit) (3:16) 
 Let the Beat Control Your Body (Mistral Mix) (7:31) 
 Workaholic (K-Groove Trance Mix) (8:17) 
 The Real Thing (Trance Mix Edit) (4:00) 
 The Magic Friend (Black Joker Trance Mix) (3:46) 
 Maximum Overdrive (Horny Horns Vocal Radio Edit) (3:44) 
 No Limit (Push's Trancendental Remix) (8:06) 
 Twilight Zone (PK Hard Trance Remix) (8:10) 
 Twilight Zone (R-C Extended Club Mix) (7:21)

References

2 Unlimited albums
2002 albums